Mäki is a Finnish surname meaning "hill". Notable people with the surname include:

 Joni Mäki (born 1995), Finnish cross-country skier
 Matti Mäki (born 1982), Finnish swimmer
 Mika Mäki (born 1988), Finnish racing driver
 Olli Mäki (1936–2019), Finnish boxer
 Kristiina Mäki (born 1991), Finnish-Czech runner
 Reijo Mäki (born 1958), Finnish writer of crime fiction
 Taisto Mäki (1910–1979), Finnish long-distance runner
 Tauno Mäki (1912–1983), Finnish sport shooter
 Teemu Mäki (born 1967), Finnish artist
 Tomi Mäki (born 1983), Finnish ice hockey player

See also
 Mägi, an Estonian surname with the same meaning ("hill")
 Maki (disambiguation)

Finnish-language surnames